Tepeilhuitl  is the name of the thirteenth month of the Aztec calendar. It is also a festival  in the Aztec religion dedicated to Popocatepetl, Iztaccihuatl  and Tlaloc. It is called the festival or feast of the Mountains.

References

Aztec calendars
Aztec mythology and religion